Percival Barnett (8 October 1889 – 17 January 1966) was an English cricketer. He played for Gloucestershire between 1908 and 1909.

References

1889 births
1966 deaths
English cricketers
Gloucestershire cricketers
Sportspeople from Cheltenham